Kompakt: Total 11 or Total 11 was released on 23 August 2010. The album is the eleventh installment of the Cologne-based microhouse label's annual compilation of vinyl releases and exclusives from its biggest artists and most promising newcomers.

Track listing

Disc One
 DJ Koze – "Der Wallach" (4:33)
 Jatoma – "Helix" (7:49)
 Jürgen Paape – "Mensch und Maschine" (4:57)
 Ada & Heiko Voss- "Walk Over" (4:08)
 Matias Aguayo – "Rollerskate (Sanfuentes & Thunder's Version)" (5:36)
 Superpitcher – "Lapdance" (6:57)
 Justus Köhncke – "I Wouldn't Wanna Be Like You" (3:18)
 Mugwump – "Losing Game" (7:17)
 It's A Fine Line – "Eins Fine Grind" (4:22)
 The Field – "Caroline" (5:05)
 S.O.G – “Silbereisen” (4:50)
 Sébastien Bouchet – “St. Anne” (6:50)
 Wolfgang Voigt – “Robert Schumann / Clara Wieck” (7:14)
 Jörg Burger – “Sparwasser” (4:39)

Disc Two
 Thomas Fehlmann – "Wasser im Fluss (Soulphiction Mix)" (7:38)
 Michael Mayer – "Picanha Frenesi" (4:46)
 Gui Boratto – "Plié (feat. Iggor Cavalera)" (3:57)
 Robag Wruhme – "Rollmoff” (6:41)
 Jonas Bering – "For Yves” (6:58)
 WALLS – “Hang Four (Allez-allez Mix)” (5:12)
 Popnoname – "Hello Gorgeous" (4:36)
 Maxime Dangles – "Dysnoptik" (10:37)
 Coma – "Bruxelles" (5:25)
 Pachanga Boys – "Power” (8:26)
 GusGus – "Hateful (Ada feat. Mayburg Mix" (5:48)
 The Three Lions – “You'll Win Again” (5:21)

2010 compilation albums
Kompakt compilation albums
Microhouse albums
Record label compilation albums